The Legislative Assembly of Penza Oblast is the regional parliament of Penza Oblast, a federal subject of Russia. The Legislative Assembly exercises its authority by passing laws, resolutions, and other legal acts and by supervising the implementation and observance of the laws and other legal acts passed by it.

The assembly consists of 36 deputies, each of whom is elected for a term of five years. 18 members are elected from single-member constituencies and 18 deputies - on party lists.

Elections

2017

2022

References

Politics of Penza Oblast
Penza Oblast